Chen Feilong (born 4 September 1982) is a former professional Chinese snooker player, playing on the World Snooker Tour from the 2018–19 season.

Career
He has been awarded a two-year professional tour card following his performances on the CBSA China Tour. Ahead of the 2018–19 season he has been announced as being based at Q House Snooker Academy in Darlington as a resident professional.

At the 2018 Northern Ireland Open, Feilong picked up his first tournament match win, defeating Marco Fu 4–2; before losing to Martin O'Donnell in the second round. On 28 November 2018 Feilong defeated former World Champion Shaun Murphy 6–3 in the first round at the 2018 UK Championship.

Performance and rankings timeline

References

External links

Chen Feilong at worldsnooker.com

Living people
Chinese snooker players
1982 births
21st-century Chinese people